The United States Senate election in Delaware for 1790 was held on October 23, 1790. George Read was elected unanimously by the state legislature.

Results

References

Delaware
1790
Senate
Single-candidate elections